Abdoulaye Diallo (born 1 June 1951) is a Guinean judoka. He competed at the 1980 Summer Olympics and the 1984 Summer Olympics.

References

1951 births
Living people
Guinean male judoka
Olympic judoka of Guinea
Judoka at the 1980 Summer Olympics
Judoka at the 1984 Summer Olympics
Place of birth missing (living people)